Jens Stoltenberg (born 16 March 1959) is a Norwegian politician who has been serving as the 13th Secretary General of NATO since 2014. A member of the Norwegian Labour Party, he previously served as the 34th Prime Minister of Norway from 2000 to 2001, and again from 2005 until 2013.

Born in Oslo as the son of the prominent diplomat and politician Thorvald Stoltenberg and Karin Stoltenberg (née Heiberg), Stoltenberg attended Oslo Waldorf School and Oslo Cathedral School before graduating with a degree in economics from the University of Oslo in 1987. During his studies, he worked as a journalist, and led Labour's youth wing from 1985 to 1989.

He started his career in government as a State Secretary in the Ministry of the Environment in 1990 and was elected to the Storting in 1993. He served as Minister of Industry and Energy from 1993 to 1996 and Minister of Finance from 1996 to 1997. He was Prime Minister from 2000 to 2001, was leader of the Labour Party from 2002 to 2014, and served as Prime Minister for a second time from 2005 to 2013. The following year, he was named as the 13th Secretary General of NATO, and his term was subsequently extended three times by the NATO heads of state and government.

Stoltenberg has been described as a cautious politician, belonging to the right-wing of social democracy. When he became prime minister in 2000, he was portrayed as the "Norwegian Tony Blair", and his policies were inspired by Blair's New Labour agenda; his first government oversaw the most widespread privatisation by any Norwegian government to that date. Stoltenberg said he was both inspired by and wanted to learn from Blair's policies. As Secretary-General of NATO, Stoltenberg has worked to strengthen the alliance's military capabilities in response to the Russo-Ukrainian War, and his tenure coincided with the largest increase in NATO defense spending since the Cold War.

Early life
Stoltenberg was born 16 March 1959 in Oslo, into the Stoltenberg Norwegian family, the family name derived from Stoltenberg in Schleswig-Holstein where a German ancestor once lived. His father, Thorvald Stoltenberg (1931–2018), was a prominent Labour party politician and diplomat who served as an ambassador, as defence minister and as foreign minister. His mother, Karin Stoltenberg (née Heiberg; 1931–2012), was a geneticist who served as state secretary in multiple governments during the 1980s. Marianne Heiberg, married to former foreign minister Johan Jørgen Holst, was his maternal aunt. Jens lived in SFR Yugoslavia from 1961 to 1964 while his father worked at the Norwegian embassy.

Stoltenberg attended primary school at Oslo Waldorf School, and upper secondary school at Oslo Cathedral School. He served his mandatory military service with the Army's Infantry Training Centre at Evjemoen in Aust-Agder. After leaving the army, Stoltenberg enrolled at the University of Oslo, graduating in 1987 with the cand.oecon. degree in economics. The title of his thesis was Makroøkonomisk planlegging under usikkerhet. En empirisk analyse ("Macroeconomic planning under uncertainty. An empirical analysis").

Stoltenberg's first steps into politics came in his early teens, when he was influenced by his sister Camilla, who at the time was a member of the then Marxist–Leninist group Red Youth. Opposition to the Vietnam War was his triggering motivation. Following heavy bombing raids against the North Vietnamese port city of Hai Phong at the end of the Vietnam War, he participated in protest rallies targeting the United States Embassy in Oslo. On at least one occasion embassy windows were broken by stone-throwing protesters. Several of Stoltenberg's friends were arrested by the police after these events.

Journalistic career (1979–1990) 
From 1979 to 1981, Stoltenberg was a journalist for Arbeiderbladet. From 1985 to 1989, he was the leader of the Workers' Youth League. From 1989 to 1990, he worked as an Executive Officer for Statistics Norway, Norway's central institution for producing official statistics. He also worked part-time as an hourly paid instructor at the University of Oslo during this period. Between 1990 and 1992, he was leader of the Oslo chapter of the Labour Party.

Up to 1990, he had regular contacts with a Soviet diplomat. He ended this relationship after being informed by the Norwegian Police Security Service his contact was a KGB agent, warning him of further contact. Stoltenberg's code name within the KGB was "Steklov".

Political career in Norway

Ministry for Environment and Minister for Trade and Energy (1990–1996) 

Stoltenberg served as State Secretary in the Ministry of the Environment from 1990 to 1991. He was first elected to Parliament in 1993 for the Oslo constituency, and is a member of the Labour Party. He served as Minister of Industry from 1993 to 1996, until Brundtland resigned.

Minister of Finance (1996–1997) 

In 1996, Thorbjørn Jagland became Prime Minister, and Stoltenberg became Minister of Finance. On 29 September 1997, Jagland resigned because of an ultimatum he had issued stating that the cabinet would resign should the party receive less than 36.9% of the popular vote. Labour only received 35.0%; true to his promise, Jagland resigned as a consequence of its 36.9 ultimatum, and power was transferred to the first cabinet of Kjell Magne Bondevik. After Jagland's resignation and while in parliamentary opposition, Stoltenberg served on the standing committee on Oil and Energy Affairs in the Storting. He became the Parliamentary Leader and Prime Minister candidate for the Labour Party in February 2000.

First term as Prime Minister (2000–2001) 

In 2000, the first cabinet of Bondevik resigned following an unsuccessful motion of confidence. Stoltenberg's first cabinet governed Norway from 17 March 2000 to 19 October 2001. Stoltenberg was the deputy leader of the Labour Party while Jagland was the party leader. Instead Jagland was given the post as Foreign Minister. Stoltenberg's first tenure as Prime Minister (2000–2001) was controversial within his own party, being responsible for reforms and modernisation of the welfare state that included partly privatising several key state-owned services and corporations. In the parliamentary election of 10 September 2001, the party suffered one of its worst results ever, winning only 24% of the vote.
                                                 
The 2001 election met with instability for the Labour Party. The Norwegian newspaper Dagbladet stated: "We are heading for a political earthquake when the votes are counted tonight, if we believe the opinion polls." In an interview with The Associated Press Jagland stated "It is unstable and unpredictable." After the election in 2001, Stoltenberg and his cabinet were forced to resign, with the Labour Party suffering from its worst election campaign results since 1924. With the 98% votes taken, the Labour Party only garnered 24%, falling from 35%. Jagland, the Labour Party leader, commented on the results saying, "We will have to make a decision about whether to continue in government after we know the full results". After the election Stoltenberg said, "What is clear is that this was a very bad election."

Some analysts have pointed out that one of the causes for their loss was that with only one year in power until the next election, more time was spent initiating or trying to start reforms than telling the people why they had to be done. Such reforms included selling down in state-owned companies, re-organisation of health care and public hospitals and changes in sick pay. The changes made from the 2001 election to the 2005 election were described by Norwegian newspaper VG as an "extreme makeover."

Party leader election

The bad election result in 2001 was quickly followed by a leadership battle between Jagland and Stoltenberg. Both Jagland, as leader, and Stoltenberg, as deputy leader, said they were open to be challenged for their positions at the party's congress in November 2002. Stoltenberg refused to say whether he would challenge Jagland for the leadership position, which was seen by political commentators as a sign that he probably would seek the leadership position. In the beginning of February 2002, Jagland, who had been briefly hospitalized in January, and had a subsequent sick leave, said that he would not seek reelection as leader. In November 2002, Stoltenberg was unanimously elected new leader at the party's congress.

Second term as Prime Minister (2005–2013) 

Stoltenberg's second cabinet governed Norway from 17 October 2005 to 16 October 2013. The 2005 parliamentary election saw a vast improvement for Labour, and the party gained a majority in parliament together with the other "Red-Green" parties, the Socialist Left Party and the Centre Party. This paved the way for a historic first in Norway, with Labour joining in a coalition government, the Red-Green Coalition, after a coalition deal with Stoltenberg was struck. Since the government's formation, key political issues such as Norwegian military participation in the war in Afghanistan, petroleum activities in the Barents Sea, LGBT rights, immigration and the quality of standard education were greatly debated by the public. Following Stoltenberg's re-election in 2009, he worked on the Norwegian response to the ongoing global recession and championed for environmentalist policies through private and corporate taxation.

A marine border dispute with Russia in the Barents Sea since 1978 was settled when Stoltenberg and President of Russia Dimitry Medvedev signed an agreement on 27 April 2010 in Oslo. The agreement is a compromise, which divides a disputed area of around  into two approximately equally sized parts. However, the agreement still needs ratification by the State Duma and the Parliament of Norway in order to be implemented. Whereas Norway had previously insisted on a border in accordance with the equidistance principle, which is recognized in international law, specifically the United Nations Convention on Law of the Sea Article 15 and the Convention on the Territorial Sea and the Contiguous Zone Article 6, Russia invoked a Stalin-era decree of the Soviet Union from 1926, which was not recognised by any other country. The new agreement replaced a controversial temporary agreement negotiated by Jens Evensen and Arne Treholt, who was later revealed to be a Soviet spy and who aided the Soviet Union in the negotiations. Most of the disputed area was within what would normally be considered Norwegian according to the relevant international treaties.

As Prime Minister, Stoltenberg worked for a constructive relationship with Russia through dialogue and cooperation underpinned by NATO's deterrence and defence capabilities. During his tenure, he also emphasised the need to focus on security challenges close to Allied territory.

22 July 2011 terror attacks

On 22 July 2011, a bomb went off in Oslo outside the government building which houses the prime minister's office, killing eight people while wounding others. About an hour later, a shooting spree, which killed 69 people, was reported at Utøya, an island forty-five minutes away where the ruling Labour Party was holding its annual youth camp. The PM was due for a visit at the youth camp the next day, and was in his residence preparing his speech at the time of the Oslo explosion.

On Sunday 24 July, Stoltenberg spoke at the church service in the Oslo Cathedral. He named two of the victims at Utøya, Monica Bøsei, who was the camp's leader, and Tore Eikeland, who was the leader of the youth chapter in Hordaland. He again vowed to work for more democracy, openness, and humanity, but without naïveté. He also said that "No one has said it better than the AUF girl who was interviewed by CNN: If one man can show so much hate, think how much love we could show, standing together." The AUF girl mentioned is Stine Renate Håheim interviewed by CNN's Richard Quest on 23 July 2011. Håheim again quoted her friend Helle Gannestad, who had tweeted this from home, watching events unfold on TV.

On 24 August 2012, 33-year-old Norwegian Anders Behring Breivik was found guilty by the Oslo District Court of having perpetrated by himself both terrorist attacks, the bombing of the prime minister's office and the shooting spree on Utøya island, and was convicted to containment, a special form of prison sentence that can be extended indefinitely—with a time frame of 21 years and a minimum time of 10 years, which, in all, is the maximum penalty in Norway.

On 3 September 2012, Norwegian daily Klassekampen wrote that the Gjørv Report on the terrorist attack "is the hardest verdict against a Norwegian cabinet since the Fact-Finding Commission of 1945 ensured that Johan Nygaardsvold's political career was abruptly halted." Stoltenberg said after the report was published that he had "ultimate responsibility for the preparedness in our country, a responsibility I take seriously," but said he would not resign.

2013 election and defeat

Stoltenberg was the Prime Minister candidate for the Red-Green Coalition in the 2013 elections, seeking re-election for a third term.

On 9 September 2013, the coalition failed to win a majority, with 72 of the required 85 mandates, despite the Labour Party remaining the largest party in Norway with 30.8%. In his speech the same night, he announced that his cabinet would resign in October 2013. Stoltenberg returned to the Parliament where he became parliamentarian leader for the Labour Party and a member of the Standing Committee on Foreign Affairs and Defence. In December 2013, he was appointed by the United Nations as a Special Envoy on Climate Change, alongside the former Ghanaian president John Kufuor.

Policies as Prime Minister
Stoltenberg has been described as a cautious politician, belonging to the right wing of social democracy.

When he became prime minister in 2000, he was portrayed as the "Norwegian Tony Blair", and his policies were inspired by Blair's New Labour agenda; his first government oversaw the most widespread privatisation by any Norwegian government to that date. Stoltenberg said he was both inspired by and wanted to learn from Blair's policies. 

In security policy, Stoltenberg favours increased military spending and dialogue.

Defense and foreign politics

While Stoltenberg was Prime Minister, Norway's defence spending increased steadily, with the result that Norway today is one of the NATO allies with the highest per capita defence expenditure. Stoltenberg has also been instrumental in modernising the Norwegian armed forces, and in contributing forces to various NATO operations.

Stoltenberg is a supporter of enhanced trans-Atlantic cooperation ties. He has also always been a supporter of Norwegian membership in the European Union.

Stoltenberg has criticized Israel over alleged violations of international law in the Palestinian Territories as well as in international waters, such as the Gaza flotilla raid. In 2006, Stoltenberg stated that "Norway condemns Israel's actions against Palestinians. Such collective punishment is totally unacceptable." Stoltenberg praised doctors Mads Gilbert and Erik Fosse for their humanitarian work in the Gaza Strip during the Gaza War, stating that "all of Norway" was behind them.

Financial crisis

Stoltenberg took an international role during the financial crisis by promoting international financial cooperation. This was among other arenas done through the International Monetary Fund (IMF) and a meeting in Chile 27–29 March 2009 where social democratic leaders from around the world met at a Progressive Governance Conference, just prior to the first G20 summit on the financial crisis. President Bill Clinton was among the delegates and panel that would chart a way out of the financial crisis, which included the host Michelle Bachelet, Britain's finance minister Gordon Brown, Brazil's President Lula da Silva and Stoltenberg. A special emergency meeting of the European Social Democratic Forum (PES) was gathered in Oslo in May 2011, on an initiative from Stoltenberg and the think tank Policy Network.

Both nationally and internationally, Stoltenberg emphasised the enormous costs the financial crisis had in the form of a high unemployment rate, and appealed for better international coordination, the balance between austerity and economic growth stimulus, active labor market measures for young people, and investments for increased innovation. Norway came out of the financial crisis with the lowest unemployment rate in Europe.

Environment and climate change

Partnering with tropical countries to preserve more of their rainforest to bind carbon dioxide (CO2) in order to reduce greenhouse gas emissions was a policy of the Stoltenberg government. In 2007, the government received support from the opposition to a long-term agreement to finance forest conservation with 3 billion NOK annually.

Stoltenberg through his governing advocated that international agreements with global taxes or quotas are the most effective means of reducing greenhouse gas emissions. At the UN Climate Change Conference 2009, a separate proposal on the preservation of rainforests with funding from rich countries, advanced by Stoltenberg and Brazilian Pres. Luiz Inácio Lula da Silva in 2009 obtained support from among others U.S. President Barack Obama during COP15 in Copenhagen.

The summit in Copenhagen ended without a binding agreement, but before the subsequent COP16 in Cancún, Stoltenberg succeeded then-British Prime Minister Gordon Brown in the leadership of the committee dealing with the financing of climate actions in developing countries, also consisting of Ethiopian Prime Minister Meles Zenawi. Under a separate forest and climate conference in Oslo in May 2010, a proposal was presented to a number of countries, with final delivery of the report in autumn 2010.

In January 2014 Jens Stoltenberg became United Nations Special Envoy on Climate Change. During the meeting there he met with Secretary General Ban Ki-Moon as well as UN Framework Convention director Christiana Figueres and both Achim Steiner and Helen Clark of the United Nations Development Programme.

Vaccines

Stoltenberg has been an advocate for having all the world's children vaccinated against infectious diseases. The first speech he gave in his second term as Prime Minister was during Norway's "Pharmaceutics days" in 2005 under the title "Vaccination against poverty." Stoltenberg was a board director of the Global Alliance for Vaccines and Immunization (GAVI) from 2002 to 2005  and was awarded the Children's Health Award in 2005.

An international initiative, with the UK, the Gates Foundation and Norway in the lead, that GAVI received more than $3.7 billion until 2015 for their work against child mortality. Stoltenberg was one of the key driving forces behind the initiative, and has stressed that this is an important contribution to save 9 million children from dying of the most common childhood illnesses.

In his New Year speech on 1 January 2013, Stoltenberg spoke about vaccination of the world's children as a personal matter of the heart. "Small jabs are giving millions of children the gift of life. Simple medicines can save their mothers. The fact that all these mothers' and children's lives can be saved is—as I see it—a miracle of our time," Stoltenberg said in his speech.

United Nations Special Envoy (2013–2014) 
In 2011, Stoltenberg received the United Nations Foundation's Champion of Global Change Award, chosen for his extraordinary effort toward meeting the Millennium Development Goals and bringing fresh ideas to global problems. In 2019, his term as Secretary General of NATO was extended for another two years. Earlier the same year, Stoltenberg had allocated 150 million Norwegian kroner of the foreign aid budget to the same foundation, which led to criticism.

In 2013, Stoltenberg served as a UN special envoy on climate change (global warming), and he chaired the UN High-Level Panel on System Wide Coherence and the High-Level Advisory Group on Climate Change Financing.

NATO Secretary General (2014–2023)

2014

On 28 March 2014, NATO's North Atlantic Council appointed Stoltenberg as designated successor of Anders Fogh Rasmussen as the 13th Secretary General of NATO and Chairman of the council, effective from 1 October 2014. The appointment had been widely expected in the media for some time, and commentators pointed out that the alliance's policies toward Russia will be the most important issue faced by Stoltenberg. Angela Merkel, the chancellor of Germany, took the initiative to appoint Stoltenberg as secretary-general, securing the support first of the United States, then of the United Kingdom, and then of all other member states. Norway was a founding member of NATO in 1949, and Stoltenberg is the first Norwegian to serve as secretary-general, although former Conservative Party Prime Minister Kåre Willoch was considered a strong candidate in 1988.

2015

In June 2015, Stoltenberg said, "I believe we don't see any immediate threat against any NATO country from the east. Our goal is still cooperation with Russia… That serves NATO and it serves Russia."

In September 2015, Czech Deputy Prime Minister Andrej Babiš criticized NATO's lack of response to the European migrant crisis. After talks with Stoltenberg on migrant crisis issue Babiš said: "NATO is not interested in refugees, though Turkey, a NATO member, is their entrance gate to Europe and smugglers operate on Turkish territory".

2016

Stoltenberg strongly condemned the 2016 Turkish coup d'état attempt and expressed full support for Recep Tayyip Erdoğan's government. He did not condemn the 2016–present purges in Turkey. In November 2016, Stoltenberg admitted that some "Turkish officers working in NATO command structures... have requested asylum in the countries where they are working."

In June 2016, Stoltenberg said it was essential to step up cooperation with Israel, since Israel had been an active alliance partner for 20 years. In June 2018, Stoltenberg told Der Spiegel that NATO would not help Israel in the case of an attack by the Islamic Republic of Iran.

In 2016, Stoltenberg stated that the NATO strongly supported "the UN-led political process to find a solution" to the dispute over the northern part of Cyprus, which has been under illegal occupation since the Turkish invasion of 1974.

The presidency of Donald Trump was a major challenge to NATO during Stoltenberg's time as secretary general. Donald Trump threatened to withdraw from NATO and undermine the alliance. A 2021 study argued that Stoltenberg played a key role in preventing Trump from undermining NATO. Stoltenberg helped to change Trump's stance on burden-sharing, as well as maintain a robust deterrence policy toward Russia.

2017

In August 2017 the last NATO Certification Exercise of the four multinational battlegroups in the Baltic partners was conducted. Canada leads the battlegroup in Latvia. Germany leads the battlegroup in Lithuania. The United Kingdom leads the battlegroup in Estonia. The United States leads the battlegroup in Poland. This "NATO Enhanced Forward Presence" was the result of the 2016 Warsaw summit and much prior planning by Stoltenberg.

In September 2017, Stoltenberg warned that Russia has used big military exercises, including Zapad 2017 exercise in Russia's Kaliningrad Oblast and Belarus, "as a disguise or a precursor for aggressive military actions against their neighbours."

2018

In January 2018, in response to the Turkish invasion of northern Syria aimed at ousting U.S.-backed Syrian Kurds from the enclave of Afrin, Stoltenberg said that Turkey is "the NATO Ally which has suffered most from terrorist attacks over many years and Turkey, as all of the countries, have the right to self defence, but it is important that this is done in a proportionate and measured way."

In February 2018, Stoltenberg stated: "We don’t see any threat [from Russia] against any NATO ally and therefore, I’m always careful speculating too much about hypothetical situations." Stoltenberg welcomed the 2018 Russia–United States summit between Vladimir Putin and Donald Trump in Helsinki, Finland. He said NATO is not trying to isolate Russia.

At the July 2018 Brussels Summit, the Alliance reconfirmed its commitment to preserving the credibility, coherence and resilience of the deterrence and defense posture, including by increasing its responsiveness, heightening readiness and improving reinforcement. In practical terms, NATO adopted political decisions with regard to: having, by 2020, 30 battalions, 30 air squadrons and 30 naval combat vessels ready to use within 30 days.

2019

In March 2019, Stoltenberg stated that the former Soviet republic of "Georgia will become a member of NATO".

In April 2019, Stoltenberg warned in a joint session of the U.S. Congress of the threat posed by Russia. In May 2019, Stoltenberg hailed Turkey's contribution to NATO. He said: "Turkey joined the Alliance in 1952, and it continues to be a highly valued member of our family of nations. As secretary-general, I greatly appreciate all that Turkey does for our Alliance."

In August 2019, Stoltenberg warned that NATO needs to "address the rise of China," by closely cooperating with Australia, New Zealand, Japan and South Korea. In June 2020, Stoltenberg urged like-minded nations to stand up to China's "bullying and coercion."

Stoltenberg "strongly condemned" the 2019 Abqaiq–Khurais attack on key Saudi Arabia's oil facilities and accused Iran of "supporting different terrorist groups and being responsible for destabilising the whole region."

In October 2019, Turkey invaded the Kurdish areas in Syria. Stoltenberg said that Turkey has "legitimate security concerns" during press conference with Turkish FM Mevlüt Çavuşoğlu.

In December 2019, Stoltenberg told journalists in Brussels that "Since 2016, Canada and European allies have added $130 billion more to the defense budgets, and this number will increase to 400 billion U.S. dollars by 2024. This is unprecedented. This is making NATO stronger."

2020

The U.S. military's 2020 Baghdad International Airport airstrike, which killed the high-level Iranian General Qasem Soleimani, brought strong reactions from around the world. Stoltenberg said, following a meeting on 6January, "all members of the Atlantic alliance stood behind the United States in the Middle East" and that "Iran must refrain from further violence and provocations."

On 14 February Stoltenberg opened the Munich Security Conference. Amongst the topics he chose to address were Donald Trump's call for the European allies to contribute more funds to the common military good, the situation in Afghanistan which he promised not to leave, and the desire of Russia to reimagine the world in terms of the spheres of influence of the post-war years of the 20th century. In a thinly-veiled reference to Chinese leadership in the 5G telecoms sector, he said that "Keeping our societies open, free and resilient must be part of our response... We should not be tempted to trade short term economic benefits for longer-term challenges to our security." Earlier in the day, Stoltenberg had dealt with the partnership issue, and listed New Zealand, Australia, Finland, Sweden, Ukraine and Georgia as such, saying "We support them, but they also support us. Many partners contribute to NATO missions and operations, for instance in Afghanistan or Iraq."

There is a long-standing dispute between Turkey and Greece in the Aegean Sea. The disagreement flared in August. The same month Stoltenberg said that "Both Greece and Turkey are two valued allies and both contribute to our shared security. There are some disagreements and I welcome that there are bilateral contacts trying to address these differences," adding that NATO is not a part of these bilateral talks.

In October 2020, Stoltenberg called for an immediate end to the fighting over the breakaway Nagorno-Karabakh region, an enclave that belongs to Azerbaijan under international law but is populated and governed by ethnic Armenians.

2021

On 19 February 2021 Stoltenberg addressed the Munich Security Conference via teleconference due to the COVID-19 pandemic with largely anodyne remarks.

On 13 April Stoltenberg called on Russia to halt its buildup of forces near the border with Ukraine. Russian Defense Minister Sergey Shoygu said that Russia has deployed troops to its western borders for "combat training exercises" in response to NATO "military activities that threaten Russia." Defender-Europe 21, one of the largest NATO-led military exercises in Europe in decades, began in mid-March 2021 and lasted until June 2021. It included "nearly simultaneous operations across more than 30 training areas" in Estonia, Bulgaria, Romania and other countries.

On 14 April 2021, Stoltenberg said the alliance has agreed to start withdrawing its troops from Afghanistan by 1 May. Soon after the withdrawal of NATO troops started, the Taliban launched an offensive against the Afghan government, quickly advancing in front of a collapsing Afghan Armed Forces. According to a U.S. intelligence report, the Afghan government would likely collapse within six months after NATO completes its withdrawal from the country. On 7 June 2021, Stoltenberg said that "we have been able to build, train Afghan security forces so they are now responsible for security in their own country." By 15 August 2021, Taliban militants controlled the vast majority of Afghanistan and had encircled the capital city of Kabul. Stoltenberg said that "it was a surprise, the speed of the collapse and how quickly that happened."

Stoltenberg attended the 2021 United Nations Climate Change Conference, and specified that the fight against climate change also is something the military could participate in. He also expressed that militaries should work with operating both fossil and environmentally friendly ones.

On 30 November Russian President Vladimir Putin stated that an expansion of NATO's presence in Ukraine, especially the deployment of any long-range missiles capable of striking Moscow or missile defence systems similar to those in Romania and Poland, would be a "red line" issue for the Kremlin. Putin argued that these missile-defense systems may be converted into launchers of offensive Tomahawk long-range cruise missiles. He said that "In a dialogue with the United States and its allies, we will insist on working out specific agreements that would exclude any further NATO moves eastward and the deployment of weapons systems that threaten us in close vicinity to Russian territory." Stoltenberg replied that "It's only Ukraine and 30 NATO allies that decide when Ukraine is ready to join NATO. Russia has no veto, Russia has no say, and Russia has no right to establish a sphere of influence to try to control their neighbors."

2022

On 14 January Stoltenberg condemned the 2022 Ukraine cyberattack. He stated that NATOs day experts in Brussels has exchanged information with Ukraine, and that experts from the alliance would be assisting Ukrainian authorities with the matter. He added: “In the coming days, NATO and Ukraine will sign an agreement on enhanced cooperation on data security, including Ukraine's access to NATO's malware sharing platform”.

On 19 February at the Munich Security Conference Stoltenberg remarked that despite NATO's "strong diplomatic efforts to find a political solution [to the Ukrainian crisis]... we have seen no sign of withdrawal or de-escalation so far. On the contrary, Russia’s build-up continues." He said "we have made written proposals to the Putin administration to reduce risks and increase transparency of military activities, address space and cyber threats, and engage on arms control, including on nuclear weapons and missiles... [Putin] is attempting to roll back history. And recreate [the] spheres of influence. [He] wants to limit NATO’s right to collective defence... and demands that we should remove all our forces and infrastructure from the countries that joined NATO after the fall of the Berlin Wall... wants to deny sovereign countries the right to choose their own path. And their own security arrangements. For Ukraine - but also for other countries, such as Finland and Sweden. And for the first time, we now see Beijing joining Moscow in calling on NATO to stop admitting new members. It is an attempt to control the fate of free nations. To rewrite the international rulebook. And impose their own authoritarian models of governance." On the dais with him was Ursula von der Leyen. Together they proceeded to give an interview to the witness audience.

On 21 February 2022, Stoltenberg condemned Russia's diplomatic recognition of two self-proclaimed separatist republics in Donbas.

On 4 March 2022, Stoltenberg said NATO would not establish a no-fly zone over Ukraine. He said, "we are not part of this conflict, and we have a responsibility to ensure that it does not escalate and spread beyond Ukraine, because that would be even more devastating and more dangerous."

On 8 March 2022, Stoltenberg warned that if there is any Russia's attack "against any NATO country, NATO territory, that will trigger Article 5" of the North Atlantic Treaty.

On 23 March 2022, Stoltenberg accused China of providing political support to Russia, "including by spreading blatant lies and misinformation, and expressed concern that "China could provide material support for the [[Russian invasion."

On 28 March the establishment of four more multinational battlegroups in Bulgaria, Hungary, Romania and Slovakia was announced, although the Slovak battlegroup had already been announced on 27 February. This brings the total number of multinational battlegroups to eight, and Stoltenberg said ahead of an extraordinary NATO summit scheduled for March 24 in Brussels that "we will have eight multinational NATO battle groups all along the Eastern flank from the Baltic to the Black Sea". The Baltic Sea is guarded by the NATO Enhanced Forward Presence, to which the four more would be added. A multinational brigade headquarters exists in Craiova, Romania and this seems to be the distribution point of the extra four battlegroups. The summit statements by Biden and NATO were somewhat controversial.

In May 2022 Stoltenberg said Finland and Sweden would be welcomed "with open arms" to NATO if they apply for membership to the alliance. While most current NATO members responded positively to the applications, Turkish president Recep Tayyip Erdoğan voiced his opposition, accusing both Sweden and Finland of tolerating Kurdish militant groups PPK and the YPG, which Turkey classifies as terrorist organizations, and followers of Fethullah Gülen, whom Turkey accuses of orchestrating a failed 2016 Turkish coup d'état attempt. Stoltenberg said that Turkey has "legitimate concerns" about Sweden and Finland joining the alliance.

On 30 November at the Bucharest meeting of NATO Foreign Ministers, were invited their counterparts from Moldova, Bosnia and Georgia, as well as Finland and Sweden. In his closing press conference Stoltenberg said that NATO expressed its solidarity with all three partners and also that "if there is one lesson learned from Ukraine it is that we need to support them now. The more support we are able to provide to these countries. The more support we are able to provide to these countries... under Russian pressure and influence in different ways... it is much better to support them now than when we have seen developments going in absolutely the wrong direction as we saw with the invasion of Ukraine earlier this year."

In December, he said in an interview that "there is no doubt that a full-fledged" war between Russia and NATO is a "possibility". Stoltenberg said that Putin is planning a long war in Ukraine and is ready to launch new offensives.

2023

Following the 2023 Chinese balloon incident between 28 January and 4 February, Stoltenberg said the incident said the balloon "confirms a pattern of Chinese behavior where we see that China has invested heavily in new capabilities, including different types of surveillance and intelligence platforms", and that it presents security challenges for the members of NATO.

On 12 February, a NATO spokesperson said Stoltenberg had no intention of seeking a fourth extension of his term as NATO secretary-general, after the German newspaper Welt am Sonntag reported member states wanted him to stay on while the Russo-Ukrainian War continues.

On 13 February, Stoltenberg said that Russian President Vladimir Putin is "sending thousands and thousands of more troops, accepting a very high rate of casualty, taking big losses, but putting pressure on the Ukrainians. What Russia lacks in quality, they try to compensate in quantity." He said that President Putin and the decision makers in Moscow are the only ones responsible for the Russo-Ukrainian War and it is necessary for NATO member countries to continue providing military aid to Ukraine.

Post-NATO career aspirations

Nomination for governorship of the Norges Bank 
In December 2021, it was reported that he sought the governorship of Norges Bank, Norway's central bank.

It was speculated that Stoltenberg would be nominated as Governor of the Norges Bank, which sources told Dagens Næringsliv in November 2021, said he would accept if he was nominated for the position. Stoltenberg’s press advisor, Sissel Kruse Larsen, told Dagens Nærlingsliv that it was still too early to say what Stoltenberg would do once he returns home to Norway. Stoltenberg confirmed on 14 December that he had applied for the position, and specified that he had told the Ministry of Finance that he could not ascend to the position before his term as NATO Secretary-General has expired on 1 October 2022.

His nomination was controversial prior to being officially announced, due to his links to the Labour Party, friendship with Prime Minister Jonas Gahr Støre and concerns for the independence of the central bank. His pre-nomination was opposed by all opposition parties, with support only coming from the government parties and the Christian Democratic Party.

His appointment was officially announced on 4 February 2022. However, after a NATO summit in March 2022 concerning the war in Ukraine, Stoltenberg accepted a renewed term of one year to continue as NATO secretary-general and thereby resigned as incoming central bank governor. Acting Governor Ida Wolden Bache was instead given the term that Stoltenberg was meant to take on.

In popular culture

Incognito taxi driver in Norway
In August 2013, Stoltenberg said on his Facebook page that he had spent an afternoon working incognito as a taxi driver in Oslo. Stoltenberg said he had wanted to "hear from real Norwegian voters" and that "taxis were one of the few places where people shared their true views." He added that, before driving the taxi, he had not driven a car in eight years. The event was videotaped in a hidden camera fashion, and released as a promotional video by the Labour party for the election campaign. It was later confirmed that 5 of the 14 customers were paid and recruited by the production company that produced the event for the Labour Party; however, none knew that they would meet Stoltenberg.

BBC Radio 4 – Desert Island Discs
On 12 July 2020 Stoltenberg was the invited guest on the long running BBC Radio 4 programme Desert Island Discs.
His musical choices included "Hungry Heart," sung by Bruce Springsteen; "So Long, Marianne," by Leonard Cohen; and "No Harm," by the duo Smerz, one of whom is his daughter Catharina.

In other media
In the crime drama 22 July, which depicts the 2011 Norway attacks, he is played by actor Ola G. Furuseth.

Controversies 
Stoltenberg participated in protest rallies against the U.S. war in Vietnam in the 1970s. In 2011, Stoltenberg said "We sang the chorus, ‘Singing Norway, Norway out of Nato.' It was a hit."

In 2001, Stoltenberg crashed his Labour Party-owned car into a parked car; he then left the premises without leaving a note with his name or number; the damages cost 8000 Norwegian kroner to repair.

In 2002, Stoltenberg admitted to having used hashish (cannabis) in his youth. He therefore asked the Ministry of Justice and Public Security to evaluate his impartiality in the upcoming government response to the report on drugs by the Stoltenberg Commission, headed by his father, Thorvald Stoltenberg.

In 2011 Stoltenberg got a 380,000 kroner boat as a birthday gift from the Norwegian Labour Party and the Norwegian Confederation of Trade Unions; the givers also paid the tax for the gift which led to criticism.

Personal life 
Stoltenberg is married to diplomat Ingrid Schulerud and they have two children: a son, Axel Stoltenberg (born 1989) who is studying Chinese at the Shanghai Jiaotong University and daughter Anne Catharina Stoltenberg (born 1992) who is a part of Smerz, an experimental pop and electronic music duo signed to XL Recordings.

He has one living sister, Camilla, a medical researcher and administrator who is one year older than him; and one late sister, Nini, four years younger, who died in 2014. Nini was a recovering heroin addict, and the Norwegian media have covered the family's efforts to cope with this challenge.

He prefers to spend his summer vacations at his family's cottage on the Hvaler Islands in the Oslofjord. An avid outdoorsman, he rides his bike often and during the winter season he is an active cross-country skier. In December 2011, in order to mark 100 years since Roald Amundsen reached the south pole on skis, Stoltenberg journeyed to Antarctica.

Although being portrayed as a staunch atheist for most of his adult life, and declining membership in the formerly official Church of Norway, Stoltenberg has stated that he does not consider himself an atheist. He explained: "Although I am not a member of any denomination, I do believe that there is something greater than man. Some call it God, others call it something else. For me, it's about understanding that we humans are small in relation to nature, in relation to the powers that are bigger and stronger than man can ever comprehend. I find that in a church."

References

External links

|-

|-

|-

|-

|-

|-

1959 births
20th-century Norwegian politicians
21st-century Norwegian politicians
Living people
Leaders of the Labour Party (Norway)
Members of the Storting
Ministers of Finance of Norway
Ministers of Trade and Shipping of Norway
Norwegian agnostics
Norwegian economists
Norwegian expatriates in Belgium
People educated at Oslo Cathedral School
People educated at Oslo Waldorf School
Politicians from Oslo
Prime Ministers of Norway
Recipients of the Order of the Cross of Terra Mariana, 1st Class
Secretaries General of NATO
Jens
University of Oslo alumni